West Newbury is a small unincorporated village in the town of Newbury, Orange County, Vermont, United States. West Newbury has a post office with ZIP code 05085.

References

Unincorporated communities in Orange County, Vermont
Unincorporated communities in Vermont